Tri-ratna secondary school, commonly referred as TRSS, is a Bhutanese refugee based school located in eastern Nepal inside the refugee camp. The school was established for the Bhutanese refugees on 5 April 1993.

References 

Educational institutions established in 1993
Nepalese refugees
Schools in Nepal
1993 establishments in Nepal